Vikings is the third studio album by Danish rock band New Politics, released on August 14, 2015 via DCD2 Records and Warner Bros. Records. Three singles were released, titled "Everywhere I Go (Kings & Queens)", "West End Kids" and "Girl Crush". "West End Kids" is featured in the video game NHL 16 and "Everywhere I Go (Kings & Queens)" is featured in the video game Tony Hawk's Pro Skater 5 and a trailer for the 2016 Amazon Prime series The Tick.

Track listing

Charts

Singles

References 

2015 albums
New Politics (band) albums
DCD2 Records albums
Warner Records albums